Cinderella is a classic fairy tale.

Cinderella may also refer to:

Films
Cinderella (1899 film), a French film directed by Georges Méliès
Cinderella (1914 film), a silent film starring Mary Pickford
Cinderella (1916 film), a German silent film directed by Urban Gad
Cinderella (1922 film), a Disney animated short
Cinderella (1930 film), an animated Felix the Cat film
Cinderella (1947 film), a Soviet musical film
Cinderella (1950 film), an animated film by Walt Disney Animation Studios
 Cinderella II: Dreams Come True, a 2002 direct-to-video sequel to the original Disney film
 Cinderella III: A Twist in Time, a 2007 direct-to-video sequel to the original Disney film
Cinderella (1955 film), a West German family film directed by Fritz Genschow
Cinderella (1957 TV film), the original TV film of the Rodgers and Hammerstein musical, starring Julie Andrews
Cinderella (1965 TV film), a TV film remake of Rodgers and Hammerstein's musical, starring Lesley Ann Warren
Tři oříšky pro Popelku (1973 film), a Czechoslovak– German film.
Cinderella (1977 film), an American erotic musical comedy
Cinderella (1979 film), a Soviet animated musical film
Cinderella (1992 film), a British animated film produced by Bevanfield Films
Cinderella (1996 film), an Australian animated film produced by Burbank Animation Studios
Cinderella (1997 film), a second TV film remake of Rodgers and Hammerstein's musical
Cinderella (2000 film), starring Kathleen Turner
Cinderella (2002 film), a Russian-Ukrainian musical
Cinderella (2006 film), a South Korean horror film
Cinderella (2012 film), a Russian romantic comedy
Cinderella (2015 American film), a Walt Disney Pictures live-action film
Cinderella (2015 Indian film), a Marathi-language film
Ratsasan, a 2018 Tamil-language film briefly known as Cinderella during production
Cinderella (2021 American film), an American musical film
Cinderella (2021 Indian film), a Tamil-language film
Sneakerella, a 2022 American musical film comedy

Television
 "Finsterella", a 2001 episode of Rugrats inspired by Cinderella
 Cinderella (Apakah Cinta Hanyalah Mimpi?) ("Is Love Just a Dream?"), a 2007 Indonesian soap opera
 "Cinderella" (The Cleaner), a 2009 episode
 "Cinderella" (Faerie Tale Theatre), a 1985 episode
 "Cinderella" (Happily Ever After: Fairy Tales for Every Child), a 1995 episode
 "Cinderella" (Jake & Blake), a 2010 episode
 "Cinderella" (Oh Baby), a 2000 episode
 "Cinderella" (The Paper Chase), a 1983 episode
 "Cinderella" (The Riches), a 2007 episode
 Cinderella (2011), a two-part television miniseries (in English) starring Vanessa Hessler, with the classic story set in 20th-century Rome

Ballet
 Cinderella (Fitinhof-Schell), a Russian ballet (premiered in 1893)
  (Cinderella), a ballet composed by Johann Strauss II (premiered in 1901)
 Cinderella, with music by Sidney Jones and choreography by Fred Farren (premiered in 1906)
 Cinderella (Prokofiev), a ballet composed by Sergei Prokofiev (premiered in 1945)
 Cinderella (Ashton) (1948), a comic ballet by Frederick Ashton, using Prokofiev's music

Musicals
Cinderella (Rodgers and Hammerstein musical), 1957
Rodgers + Hammerstein's Cinderella (Beane musical), an adaptation of the Rodgers and Hammerstein musical
Cinderella (2013 cast album)
Cinderella (Lloyd Webber musical), 2020

Opera
Cendrillon (Isouard), 1810 opera by Nicolas Isouard
La Cenerentola, 1817 opera by Gioachino Rossini
Cendrillon, 1899 opera by Jules Massenet
Cendrillon (Viardot), 1904 chamber opera by Pauline Viardot
La Cenicienta, 1966 children's opera by Jorge Peña Hen
Cinderella (Deutscher), 2015 opera by Alma Deutscher

Popular music
Cinderella Sanyu (born 1985), Ugandan musician also known as Cindy
Cinderella (band), an American glam metal band
Cinderella (Filipino band), a 1970s Manila Sound pop group
Cinderella (Sajjad Ali album), 2003

Songs
Cinderella (CNBLUE song), 2015
"Cinderella" (Diana Vickers song), 2013
Cinderella (Firefall song), 1976
Cinderella (i5 song), also covered by Play, The Cheetah Girls, and Tata Young
"Cinderella" (Krista Siegfrids song), 2014
"Cinderella" (Lionel Richie song), 2000
"Cinderella" (Mac Miller song), 2016
Cinderella (Shakaya song), 2002
Cinderella (Steven Curtis Chapman song), 2007
Cinderella (Sweetbox song), 2001
Cinderella (Vince Gill song), 1987
"Cinderella" (Main Title), from the Disney Cinderella (1950 film), performed by The Jud Conlon Chorus and Marni Nixon, soundtrack released 1997
"Cinderella", by Alexandra Joner
"Cinderella", by Britney Spears from her self-titled third studio album, Britney
"Cinderella", by Brotherhood of Man from B for Brotherhood
"Cinderella", a Chris Brown remix of the Rihanna song "Umbrella"
"Cinderella", by Diana Vickers from Music to Make Boys Cry
"Cinderella", by Firefall
"Cinderella", by Paul Anka
"Cinderella", by The Sonics from Boom
"Cinderella", by Hooverphonic from A New Stereophonic Sound Spectacular

Other uses
Cinderella (franchise), a Disney franchise based on the 1950 film
 Cinderella (Disney character), the character from the Disney franchise
Cinderella, 1966 pantomime, featuring Cliff Richard and The Shadows
Cinderella (fly), a genus of insects
Cinderella (software), an interactive geometry software
Cinderella (sports), a team or player who advances much further in a tournament than expected
Cinderella, West Virginia, an unincorporated community and coal town
Cinderella, or the Little Glass Slipper, a book illustrated by Marcia Brown
Cinderella book, an Introduction to Automata Theory, Languages, and Computation
Cinderella stamp, a non-postal stamp-like label
Mufaro's Beautiful Daughters: An African Tale, a 1987 book written by John Steptoe as an African version of Cinderella.
MS Viking Cinderella, a 1989 Viking Line cruiseferry
The Egyptian Cinderella, a 1991 book written by Shirley Climo as an Egyptian Cinderella.
The Rough-Face Girl, a 1992 book written by Rafe Martin as an Indian version of Cinderella.
The Korean Cinderella, a 1996 book written book by Shirley Climo as Korean version of Cinderella.
Ever After, a 1998 American romantic drama film inspired by the Cinderella fairy tale.
A Cinderella Story (film series), an American series of films based on Cinderella owned by Warner Bros.
Ever After The Musical,a 2015 musical based on the 1998 film of the same name inspired by the Cinderella fairy tale.

See also
Cindarella, a trilobite-like animal from the Cambrian Chengjiang biota
Cinderalla, a 2000 manga by Junko Mizuno
Cinderfella, a 1960 film starring Jerry Lewis
Cindrella (film), a 2016 Sri Lankan romantic film